Substances, mixtures, and exposure circumstances in this list have been classified as group 1 by the International Agency for Research on Cancer (IARC): The agent (mixture) is carcinogenic to humans. The exposure circumstance entails exposures that are carcinogenic to humans. This category is used when there is sufficient evidence of carcinogenicity in humans. Exceptionally, an agent (mixture) may be placed in this category when evidence of carcinogenicity in humans is less than sufficient but there is sufficient evidence of carcinogenicity in experimental animals and strong evidence in exposed humans that the agent (mixture) acts through a relevant mechanism of carcinogenicity.

Agents

Infectious conditions
Viruses
Human immunodeficiency virus type 1 (infection with)
Human T-cell lymphotropic virus type I
Human papillomavirus types 16, 18, 31, 33, 35, 39, 45, 51, 52, 56, 58, and 59 
Hepatitis B virus (chronic infection with)
Hepatitis C virus (chronic infection with)
Kaposi sarcoma herpesvirus
Epstein–Barr virus

Bacterium
Helicobacter pylori (infection with)

Worms
Clonorchis sinensis (infection with)
Opisthorchis viverrini (infection with)
Schistosoma haematobium (infection with)

Chemical substances
Acetaldehyde associated with consumption of alcoholic beverages
Aflatoxins
4-Aminobiphenyl
Aristolochic acids, and plants containing them
Arsenic and inorganic arsenic compounds
Asbestos (all forms, including actinolite, amosite, anthophyllite, chrysotile, crocidolite, tremolite)
Azathioprine
Benzene
Benzidine, and dyes metabolized to
Benzo[a]pyrene
Beryllium and beryllium compounds
1,3-Butadiene
1,4-Butanediol dimethanesulfonate (Busulphan, Myleran)
Cadmium and cadmium compounds
Carbadox (methyl N-[(E)-(1,4-dioxidoquinoxaline-1,4-diium-2-yl)methylideneamino]carbamate) – GHS Category 1B Carcinogen
Chlornapazine (N,N-Bis(2-chloroethyl)-2-naphthylamine)
Chlorambucil
Bis(chloromethyl)ether
Chloromethyl methyl ether
Chromium(VI) (Hexavalent chromium) compounds
Ciclosporin
Cyclophosphamide
1,2-Dichloropropane
Diethylstilboestrol
Ethanol in alcoholic beverages
Erionite
Ethylene oxide
Etoposide alone, and in combination with cisplatin and bleomycin
Fluoro-edenite fibrous amphibole
Formaldehyde
Gallium arsenide
Lindane
Melphalan
Methoxsalen (8-Methoxypsoralen) plus ultraviolet A radiation
4,4'-Methylenebis(2-chloroaniline) (MOCA)
MOPP and other combined chemotherapy including alkylating agents
Mustard gas (Sulfur mustard)
2-Naphthylamine
Nickel compounds
4-(N-Nitrosomethylamino)-1-(3-pyridyl)-1-butanone (NNK)
N-Nitrosonornicotine (NNN)
2,3,4,7,8-Pentachlorodibenzofuran
3,4,5,3’,4’-Pentachlorobiphenyl (PCB-126)
Pentachlorophenol
Polychlorinated biphenyls
Semustine [1-(2-Chloroethyl)-3-(4-methylcyclohexyl)-1-nitrosourea, Methyl-CCNU]
Silica dust, crystalline, in the form of quartz or cristobalite
Tamoxifen
2,3,7,8-Tetrachlorodibenzo-p-dioxin (TCDD)
Thiotepa (1,1',1"-Phosphinothioylidynetrisaziridine)
Treosulfan
Trichloroethylene
o-Toluidine
Vinyl chloride

Radiations and physical agents thereof 

Ionizing radiation (all types)
Neutron radiation
Ultraviolet radiation (wavelengths 100-400 nm, encompassing UVA, UVB, and UVC)
Solar radiation
X-ray and gamma radiation
Phosphorus-32, as phosphate
Plutonium
Radioiodines, including iodine-131
Radionuclides, α-particle-emitting, internally deposited
Radionuclides, β-particle-emitting, internally deposited
Radium-224 and its decay products
Radium-226 and its decay products
Radium-228 and its decay products
Radon-222 and its decay products
Thorium-232 and its decay products

Complex mixtures/agents

Aflatoxins (naturally occurring mixtures of)
Outdoor air pollution
Outdoor air pollution, particulate matter in
Alcoholic beverages
Areca nut
Betel quid with tobacco
Betel quid without tobacco
Coal-tar pitch
Coal-tars (see Coal-tar distillation)
Engine exhaust, diesel
Estrogen-progestogen menopausal therapy (combined) 
Estrogen-progestogen oral contraceptives (combined)
Estrogen therapy, postmenopausal
Fission products, including strontium-90
Leather dust
Mineral oils, untreated or mildly treated
Phenacetin, analgesic mixtures containing
Plants containing aristolochic acid
Polychlorinated biphenyls, dioxin-like, with a Toxicity Equivalency Factor (TEF) according to WHO (PCBs 77, 81, 105, 114, 118, 123, 126, 156, 157, 167, 169, 189) 
Processed meat (consumption of)
Salted fish, Chinese-style
Shale-oils
Soot (as found in occupational exposure of chimney sweeps)
Wood dust

Exposure circumstances 

Acheson process, occupational exposure associated with
Acid mists, strong inorganic
Aluminium production
Auramine production
Boot and shoe manufacture and repair (see Leather dust, Benzene)
Chimney sweeping (see Soot)
Coal gasification
Coal, indoor emissions from household combustion of
Coal-tar distillation
Coke production
Furniture and cabinet making (see Wood dust)
Haematite mining (underground)
Iron and steel founding (occupational exposure during)
Isopropyl alcohol manufacture using strong acids
Magenta production
Opium consumption
Painter (occupational exposure as a)
Paving and roofing with coal-tar pitch (see Coal-tar pitch)
Rubber manufacturing industry
Tobacco, smokeless
Tobacco smoke, second-hand
Tobacco smoking
Ultraviolet-emitting tanning devices
Welding fumes

See also
 IARC group 2A
 IARC group 2B
 IARC group 3

Notes

References

External links
 Description of the list of classifications, IARC
 List of Classifications (latest version)

 List of Classifications by cancer sites with sufficient or limited evidence in humans, Volumes 1 to 124 (Last update: 8 July 2019)
Agents Classified by the IARC Monographs, Volumes 1–123 (Last update: 25 March 2019)